Croitana is a genus of skipper butterflies in the family Hesperiidae.

Species
Croitana aestiva E.D. Edwards, 1979
Croitana arenaria E.D. Edwards, 1979
Croitana croites Hewitson, 1874

References
Natural History Museum Lepidoptera genus database
Croitana at funet

Hesperiidae genera
Trapezitinae